Sully Osvaldo de Jesús Bonnelly Canaán (born December 24, 1956) is a Dominican-American fashion designer of women's ready-to-wear. Trained at Oscar de La Renta. He is the founder, owner, and creative director of Sully Bonnelly, the brand.

Early years
Bonnelly was born into a family of both Corsican and French descent. An uncle of him, Rafael Bonnelly-Fondeur, became president of the Dominican Republic from 1962 to 1963. The oldest of five children and the only boy, was born in Santo Domingo, Dominican Republic to Dominican parents, Carlos Sully Bonnelly Castellanos (father) and Esmira Josefina Canaán Díaz (mother), his sisters are Elizabeth Sikaffy, Sofia Durkee, Lilliam Bonnelly and Carolina Bonnelly, he also has a paternal half-brother: Carlos Sully Bonnelly Salazar. He graduated high School from Colegio Dominicano de la Salle

Bonnelly studied architecture at Universidad Autónoma de Santo Domingo, moved to New York in 1980 to study at Parsons School of Design were he graduated in 1983. Began his career in fashion as Oscar de la Renta's assistant. He also worked as a designer for the houses of Bill Blass, were he created a new category of clothing in the "Bridge market" "Evening Separates", and Eli Tahari before starting his first company Sully Bonnelly LTD in 1993, later called Sully Bonnelly International, retailing at Saks Fifth Avenue, Neiman Marcus, Bergdorf Goodman and other stores around the globe. In 2006 he received a call from Oscar de la Renta and was named creative director for the O Oscar Collection.

Career 
Bonnelly, a native of Santo Domingo in the Dominican Republic, grew up with fashion being an intrinsic part of his identity. He studied architecture at UASD before moving to New York where he graduated from Parsons School of Design and began his career in fashion as Oscar de la Renta's assistant. He then worked as a designer for the houses of Bill Blass and Eli Tahari before starting his namesake collection in 1998, retailing at Saks Fifth Avenue, Neiman Marcus, Bergdorf Goodman and other better stores around the world. He later returned to Oscar de la Renta as creative director for the O Oscar Collection. In 2000 Sully Bonnelly Accents was launched, an exclusive collection for Home Shopping Network (HSN) and HSN en Espanol, making him the first Latin American designer featured on a shopping network. In 2001 Bonnelly served as Creative Director for Citrine, a contemporary sportswear collection. Two years later the Sully Bonnelly Bridal collection was launched. In 1999 he received the Golden Coast Award, a prestigious fashion award in Chicago. In 2001 was elected member to the Council of Fashion Designers of America (CFDA) joining an important community of over 300 American fashion and accessory designers. Additionally, he has been honored by several Dominican organizations for his outstanding work in fashion. New York Governor George Pataki honored him in 2005 in celebration of Dominican Heritage Month. Most recently Bonnelly received the Orden al Merito Ciudadano, a recognition given to Dominicans all over the world who have distinguished themselves in their chosen careers and done honor to their homeland. Past honorees include: the authors Junot Diaz and Julia Alvarez, the musician Michael Camilo and fashion designer Oscar de la Renta. Today, Sully Bonnelly is Creative Director for Isaac Mizrahi  Sportswear, Eveningwear and Dresses. Memories of his travels around the world infuse all his designs, forming his imaginary scrapbook of colors, textures, rhythms and fragrances. These inspirations materialize into exciting designs that instill in women who wear them a feeling of well-being and self-confidence.

Other notable accomplishments 
In 2001, Bonnelly held the position as Creative Director for Citrine. In 2002, he designed Celia Cruz's dress for the Latin Grammy Awards. In 2003, the Bonnelly Bridal collection was launched. In 2008, Bonnelly became the Creative Director for Muse, a contemporary women's clothing division of Maggy London in New York and Anthracite by Muse.

Recognitions and awards 
1999 44th ANNUAL GOLD COAST FASHION AWARD Designer of the Year.
2001, Was elected member to the Council of Fashion Designers of America, an important community of over 300 American fashion and accessory designers.
2001  HOSTOS COMMUNITY COLLEGE For Outstanding Personal Achievement and Contribution to the Dominican Community in the USA.
2002 QUISQUEYA LIFE In Appreciation for your Dedication to the Dominican Community.
2002 AYUDA FOR THE ARTS Guiding Star Award.
2004 CERTIFICATE OF SPECIAL CONGRESSIONAL RECOGNITION - CHARLES B RANGEL In Recognition of Outstanding and Invaluable Service to the Community.
2005 New York Governor George Pataki acknowledged Bonnelly as a distinguished fashion designer, during Dominican Heritage Month.
2006 DOMINICAN TIMES MAGAZINE DTM Latino Trendsetters AWARD.
2008 DOMINICANA MODA 2008 DM08 For Outstanding International C  areer.
2008 The Consulate General of the Dominican Republic  of Citizen Merit, Orden al Merito Ciudadano, an award given to Dominicans all over the world who have distinguished themselves through their careers and represented honor to their homeland.
2011 PRESIDENCY OF THE DOMINICAN REPUBLIC-Outstanding Dominican Who Honors the Dominican Republic Abroad
2013 DREAM PROJECT Outstanding Dominican.
2013 DOMINICAN BOARD FOR DANCE Thanks for your generous contribution to the "Las Noches" Gala ...
2013 NEW YORK CITY COUNCIL "City Council Citation".New York City Council
2013 DOMINICANA MODA 2013 DM13. Sully Bonnelly para Jumbo "Best Collection with Mass Distribution".
2015 UASD UNIVERSIDAD AUTONOMA DE SANTO DOMINGO Recognition for his significant contributions to the development of the Industrial Design and Fashion career.Universidad Autónoma de Santo Domingo
2019 MINISTRY OF FOREIGN AFFAIRS OF THE DOMINICAN REPUBLIC Award Mr. Oscar de la Renta" to the Dominican Emigrant ".
2020 NEW YORK DOMINICAN PARADE Leadership in the Fashion Industry.
2021 QUISQUEYA ES MODA. In Recognition for his work in Fashion.
2022 Congress of the United States House of Representatives “In Celebration and Recognition of his Career in Fashion” presented by Adriano Espaillat.

Personal life
In January 2012, Sully Bonnelly married Robert Littman, president of the Vergel Foundation, which manages a collection of modern and contemporary Mexican Art in New York and Cuernavaca, Mexico.

Bonnelly's house was featured in Rima Suqi's book Fashion Designers At Home.

References

External links 
 Official Website
 Collecion Primavera-Verano 2010
 DominicanaModa-2010

1956 births
Living people
Dominican Republic fashion designers
Dominican Republic people of Corsican descent
Dominican Republic people of French descent
Dominican Republic people of Lebanese descent
Dominican Republic people of Spanish descent
Dominican Republic people of Puerto Rican descent
Dominican Republic people of Virgin Islands descent
Universidad Autónoma de Santo Domingo alumni
LGBT fashion designers
Dominican Republic LGBT people
White Dominicans
People from Santo Domingo